Coleophora kurokoi is a moth of the family Coleophoridae. It is found in Japan and China.

The larvae feed on the leaves of Artemisia princeps and Chrysanthemum morifolium sinense.

References

kurokoi
Moths described in 1974
Moths of Asia